The Neverending Story is a German fantasy novel by Michael Ende.

The Neverending Story may also refer to:

 The NeverEnding Story (film series)
 The NeverEnding Story (film), 1984, based on the novel
 Never Ending Story (film), a 2012 South Korean film
 The Neverending Story (TV series), 1995–1996
 "The NeverEnding Story" (song), by Limahl, the theme from the 1984 film
 "Never-ending Story", a 2003 single by Within Temptation from their album Mother Earth

See also